The Forty-Seventh Camp of Rochambeau's Army is a historic military camp site in Windham, Connecticut.  Located along Scotland Road a short way east of Windham Center, it was the site of a French Army camp in November 1782, when that army was en route from victory at Yorktown to Rhode Island.  The camp site is considered of archaeological importance, because it can shed light on transient military camp sites, whose locations are not often known.  It was listed on the National Register of Historic Places in 2003.

Description and history
Rochambeau's 47th camp was, according to a map prepared by a French military engineer, located on both sides of Scotland Road, between Ballamahack Road and Middle Hill Road, east of the village center of Windham. The modern roadway, designated Connecticut Route 14, is one of the most evocative sections of the army's march route in terms if its landscape, and is also listed on the National Register.

When the French Army marched west from Providence to the area outside New York City in 1781, its chosen site in Windham was the fourth camp, and was located west of Windham Center on the banks of the Shetucket River.  French diarists described the route west of Windham as being particularly difficult.  An enlisted man in the first brigade recounted having a rest day at this site on the return march, where they were joined by the second brigade "in frightful weather".

See also
March Route of Rochambeau's army
List of historic sites preserved along Rochambeau's route
National Register of Historic Places listings in Windham County, Connecticut

References

Military facilities on the National Register of Historic Places in Connecticut
Buildings and structures in Windham County, Connecticut
Windham, Connecticut
Historic places on the Washington–Rochambeau Revolutionary Route
American Revolution on the National Register of Historic Places
Connecticut in the American Revolution